Ernest James Stevens (10 July 18453 March 1922) was an Australian politician and businessman who served as a Member of the Queensland Legislative Assembly and later Member of the Queensland Legislative Council in colonial Queensland and Australia.

Early life
Ernest James Stevens was born in 1845 in Victoria, the son of Frederick Perkins Stevens and his wife Jane (née Rule).

On 20 June 1877 he married Ada Constance Jackson in Casterton, Victoria.

Political life

Ernest Stevens was elected to the Queensland Legislative Assembly to represent the electoral district of Warrego from 14 November 1878 to 17 August 1883.

He was elected to the Queensland Legislative Assembly to represent the electoral district of Logan from 17 August 1883 to 4 April 1896.

In July 1884 Stevens proposed that the Queensland Government erect a fence to prevent the infestation of rabbits in New South Wales from spreading into Queensland (his Logan electorate being very close to the New South Wales border).

On 6 April 1899 he was appointed a life member of the Queensland Legislative Council, an appointment that terminated with his retirement on 7 September 1920.

Later life
Ernest Stevens died on 3 March 1922 in a Brisbane private hospital, following a period of ill-health. He was buried in Southport Cemetery on 4 March 1922.

References

Members of the Queensland Legislative Assembly
Members of the Queensland Legislative Council
1845 births
1922 deaths